
Illsee is a natural lake used as a reservoir above Sierre, in the Valais, Switzerland.

See also
List of mountain lakes of Switzerland

Lakes of Valais
Reservoirs in Switzerland